The 2012 United States Senate election in New Jersey took place on November 6, 2012, concurrently with the 2012 U.S. presidential election as well as other elections to the United States Senate and House of Representatives and various state and local elections.

Bob Menendez became the first Hispanic-American U.S. senator to represent New Jersey in January 2006 when former U.S. senator Jon Corzine appointed him to the seat after having resigned to become governor of New Jersey, following his election in November 2005.  In November 2006, after a tough and painful election, Menendez defeated Republican state senator Thomas Kean, Jr. with 53.3% of the vote.

Incumbent Democratic U.S. Senator Bob Menendez won re-election to a second full term. He was the first Democratic Senate candidate to carry Somerset County since Bill Bradley in 1984. This is the only time since 1976 that a candidate for this seat received over 55% of the vote. This election marked the first time that someone won this seat by double digits since 1976 as well.

Democratic primary

Candidates 
 Bob Menendez, incumbent U.S. Senator

Polling

Results

Republican primary

Candidates

Declared 
 David Brown, inventor
 Joe Kyrillos, State Senator
 Bader Qarmout, businessman and adjunct professor at the County College of Morris
 Joseph Rudy Rullo, businessman

Withdrew 
 Ian Linker, attorney
 Anna Little, former mayor of Highlands and candidate for NJ-06 in 2010

Declined 
 Diane Allen, state senator, candidate for the U.S. Senate in 2002 and former news broadcaster
 Chris Christie, Governor of New Jersey and former U.S. Attorney
 John Crowley, biotechnology executive
 Michael Doherty, state senator
 Tim Smith, financial services firm executive and member of the Roxbury Township Council
 Jay Webber, State Assemblyman and former New Jersey Republican State Committee chairman

Polling

Results

General election

Candidates 
 Bob Menendez (Democratic), incumbent U.S. Senator
 Joe Kyrillos (Republican), state senator
 Inder "Andy" Soni (America First)
 Ken Wolski (Green), medical marijuana activist and former nurse
 Gwen Diakos (Jersey Strong Independents), civilian defense contractor
 Kenneth R. Kaplan (Libertarian), commercial real estate broker
 Eugene Martin LaVergne (Independent)
 Daryl Mikell Brooks (Reform Nation), activist
 Robert "Turk" Turkavage (Responsibility Fairness Integrity), former FBI agent
 Greg Pason (Socialist), National Secretary of the Socialist Party USA and perennial candidate
 J. David Dranikoff (Totally Independent Candidate), businessman

Debates 
Three debates were scheduled. The first debate took place on October 4, 2012, at Montclair State University. Menendez and Kyrillos participated. The second took place on October 10 at NJ 101.5 studios, Trenton NJ The third was to take place on October 17 at Mercer County Community College
External links
Complete video of debate, October 4, 2012 - C-SPAN
Complete video of debate, October 13, 2012 - C-SPAN

Fundraising

Top contributors

Top industries

Predictions

Polling

Results

By congressional district
Menendez won 9 of 12 congressional districts, including the 2nd, 3rd, and 5th districts, which elected Republicans to the House.

See also 
 2012 United States Senate elections
 2012 United States House of Representatives elections in New Jersey

References

External links 
 New Jersey Division of Elections
 Campaign contributions at OpenSecrets.org
 Outside spending at Sunlight Foundation
 Candidate issue positions at On the Issues

Official campaign websites (Archived)
 Ken Kaplan for U.S. Senate
 Gwen Diakos for U.S. Senate
 Joe Kyrillos for U.S. Senate
 Bob Menendez for U.S. Senate
 Greg Pason for U.S. Senate

2012
New Jersey
Senate